At the beginning of the Second World War, Canada did not have an extensive manufacturing industry besides car manufacturing. Therefore, most of Canadian weapons and equipment during the war were imported from either Britain or the US.

Knives and bayonets

Small Arms

Pistols

Submachine guns

Rifles

Grenades and grenade launchers
This list is grossly incomplete, listing a small fraction of approximately 30 grenade varieties used by Canadians during World War II.

Flamethrowers
Flamethrower, Portable, No 2 "Ack-Pack"

Machine guns

Infantry and dual-purpose machine guns

Vehicle and aircraft machine guns

Artillery

Infantry mortars

Heavy mortars & rocket launchers
Land Mattress
C-21 UCM -

Field artillery

Anti-tank guns

Anti-tank weapons (besides anti-tank guns)

Boys Anti-Tank Rifle
PIAT-1943-1950s
Clam Magnetic Mine
Mk 5 mine
Mk 2 mine
Bazooka
Bangalore torpedo (not a grenade or anti-tank)

Anti-aircraft weapons

Vehicles
Canada produced a wide variety of combat vehicles during World War II domestically, but all primary fighting vehicles were imported because of manufacturing quality concerns.

Tankettes
Carden Loyd Mk IV tankette - not used in combat

Tanks

Self-propelled guns

Tank-based

Other
M3 75mm Gun Motor Carriage - M3 Half-track equipped with the M1A1 75 mm gun

Armored cars

Engineering and command

Sherman Ib recovery vehicle

Tractors & prime movers

Miscellaneous vehicles

Aircraft
Although the Canadian government purchased and built thousands of military aircraft for use by the RCAF Home War Establishment (RCAF Eastern Air Command and RCAF Western Air Command) and the Canadian-based units of the British Commonwealth Air Training Plan, under the provisions of the plan Canada was to provide the training aircraft and facilities and a very large number of Canadian airmen would be committed to go overseas to fight in Article XV squadrons formed in the Great Britain and known as 400 series squadrons of the Royal Canadian Air Force.  Forty-four of these squadrons were formed and most under this agreement were equipped by the British largely from their stocks and that is why many of the types of aircraft flown in combat in great numbers (such as the North American Mustang, Boulton Paul Defiant, Bristol Beaufighter, hundreds of Supermarine Spitfires of various marks, British built Avro Lancasters, Vickers Wellington, Hawker Typhoon, Short Sunderland, etc.) by most of the RCAF squadrons engaged in the fighting are missing from the following list altogether (or the quantities actually used by the RCAF overseas are not included in the numbers given below).

Fighters

Attack aircraft

Bombers

Reconnaissance aircraft

Trainers

Transports

Radars

Night Watchman (NW), 200-MHz, 1-kW prototype of SW radars (from 1940)
SW1C - surface-warning radar for merchant ships and frigates (from 1941)
SW2C - frequency changed to 215 MHz (1942)
SW3C - miniaturization to fit on torpedo boats, plan-position indicator (1943) 
CD radar - coastal defense only (from 1942)
CDX radar - improvements and export to USSR (from 1943)
GL IIIC - mobile air search radar (from 1941)
Type 268 – 10 GHz submarine snorkel search radar (from 1944)
MEW/AS - 2.8 GHz, 300 kW submarine detection radar (from 1943)
MEW/HF - air search radar (from 1943)
2 other unknown radar types used operationally
18 radar types developed but never used

Cartridges and shells

Uniforms, Load Bearing and Protective Equipment

Uniforms

Load bearing equipment

Head dress

See also
List of infantry weapons of the Canadian military

Notes

References

External links
www.canadiansoldiers.com/weapons

 
 
Canadian Army World War II